1. deild in the 1976 season was the 34th season of Faroese Premier League Football, and the first season in which it was referred to as 1. deild (First Division).

Overview
It was contested by 7 teams, and TB Tvøroyri won the championship.

League standings

Results
The schedule consisted of a total of 12 games. Each team played two games against every opponent in no particular order. One of the games was at home and one was away.

Regular home games

References

1. deild seasons
Faroe
Faroe
1976 in the Faroe Islands